Klinkhammer Lakes (also, Murphy Lake) is a lake in Douglas County, Washington, south of Murphy Lake.  Klinkhammer Lakes lie at an elevation of 2100 feet (640 m).  The largest lake measures 640 m by 320 m (0.4 miles by 0.2 miles).

References

Lakes of Washington (state)
Lakes of Douglas County, Washington